18th & Crystal is a northbound-only bus rapid transit station in Arlington, Virginia, located near the intersection of 18th Street South and Crystal Drive. The stop is on a mixed-traffic segment of the Metroway that is restricted to buses during certain hours. It provides service along the route to northern Crystal City.

History 
18th & Crystal opened to the public as one of the original Metroway stations; the station opened for service on August 24, 2014.

Initially, the station was a sidewalk-level bus stop. It was upgraded on April 17, 2016.

References

External links
 Official Metroway site

Buildings and structures in Arlington, Virginia
Metroway
2014 establishments in Virginia
Transport infrastructure completed in 2014
Bus stations in Virginia
Crystal City, Arlington, Virginia